Venus in Cancer is the sixth studio album by composer and guitarist Robbie Basho, released in 1969 by Blue Thumb Records.

Track listing

Personnel
Adapted from the Venus in Cancer liner notes.

Musicians
Robbie Basho – steel-string acoustic guitar, vocals
Victor Chancellor – acoustic guitar (A2)
Moreen Libet – viola (B1)
Kreke Ritter – french horn (B1)

Production and additional personnel
Ed Bogus – production
Bob DeSousa – engineering
Barry Feinstein – photography
Paul Slaughter – photography
Roy Ward – engineering
Tom Wilkes – design, photography

Release history

References

External links 
 

1969 albums
Blue Thumb Records albums
Robbie Basho albums